Eurata hermione is a moth of the subfamily Arctiinae. It was described by Carlos Berg in 1878 and is found in Argentina.

References

Arctiinae
Moths described in 1878